My Fair Zombie is a Canadian comedy-musical horror film written by Trevor Payer and directed by Brett Kelly. The film was produced by Anne-Marie Frigon. Its name and theme were created as an amusing resemblance to the classic stage play Pygmalion by George Bernard Shaw. My Fair Zombie was filmed in 2012, and features Sacha Gabriel as Eliza Dolittle, Lawrence Evenchick as Henry Higgins, and Barry Caiger as Colonel Pickering. Supporting roles include Jason Redmond as Freddy and Jennifer Vallance as Ms. Pearce. The soundtrack was written by Stephen John Tippet, of the Ottawa Jazz outfit, My Tiny Circus, and performed by the cast. The director of cinematography was Jeremy Kennedy and the costumes were designed by Cynthia Sanoy.

Plot 
In the Edwardian era (London, England), zombie attacks have become the norm. A phonetics professor Henry Higgins wagers with Colonel Pickering, that he can train, and transform a zombie (Eliza Dolittle) into a "proper" English-speaking member of upper-class society. Comedy ensues as Henry Higgins makes attempts to introduce a zombie to high culture.

Cast 
 Sacha Gabriel as Eliza Dolittle
 Lawrence Evenchick as Henry Higgins
 Barry Caiger as Colonel Pickering
 Jennifer Vallance as Mrs. Pearce
 Jason Redmond as Freddy Eynesford-Hill
 Trevor Payer as Neppomuck
 Gabrielle MacKenzie as Mrs. Eynesford-Hill
 Penelope Goranson as Mrs. Higgins
 Veronika D'Arc as Parlour Maid
 Jody Haucke as Rough Man
 John Migliore as Zombie
 Madison Payer as Bitey
 Ian Quick as French Ambassador
 Anik Rompre as Zombie
 Shannon Walker as Maid
 Hunter Delorme as Maid
 Peter Whittaker as Police Officer

Awards 
 2013 "Best Comedy Feature" Award at the Buffalo Dreams Fantastic Film Festival
 "Best Film" Montreal Horrorfest 2013

External links
 
 "Dreamer Awards" Buffalo Dreams Fantastic Film Festival

2013 films
Canadian zombie comedy films
2013 comedy horror films
Canadian comedy horror films
English-language Canadian films
Films shot in Ottawa
2013 comedy films
Films set in the 1900s
Films set in London
2010s Canadian films